Mitsuhira (written: 三平) is a Japanese surname. Notable people with the surname include:

, Japanese footballer

Mitsuhira (written: 光平) is also a masculine Japanese given name. Notable people with the name include:

, Japanese kugyō

Japanese-language surnames
Japanese masculine given names